Maupo Msowoya (born 14 May 1982 in Lilongwe) is a Malawian footballer, who currently plays for ESCOM United.

International career
Msowoya played for the Malawi national football team and is part of the team competing at the 2010 African Cup of Nations.

Personal life
Maupo is the elder brother of Chiukepo Msowoya who plays as striker for ESCOM United.

References

1982 births
Living people
People from Lilongwe
Malawian footballers
Malawi international footballers
2010 Africa Cup of Nations players
Malawian expatriate footballers
ESCOM United FC players
Association football defenders